Yevstratovsky is a rural locality (a khutor) in Zakharovskoye Rural Settlement, Kletsky District, Volgograd Oblast, Russia. The population was 407 as of 2010. There are 15 streets.

Geography 
Yevstratovsky is located on the bank of the Kurtlak River, 20 km southwest of Kletskaya (the district's administrative centre) by road. Zakharov is the nearest rural locality.

References 

Rural localities in Kletsky District